The 1915–16 season was Madrid Football Club's 14th season in existence. The club played some friendly matches. They also played in the Campeonato Regional Centro (Central Regional Championship) and the Copa del Rey, winning the former and losing the final to Athletic Bilbao in the latter.

Friendlies

Copa Espuñes

Competitions

Overview

Campeonato Regional Centro

League table

Matches

Copa del Rey

Semifinals

Final

Notes

References

External links
Realmadrid.com Official Site
1915–16 Squad
1915–16 matches
1915–16 (Campeonato de Madrid)
International Friendlies of Real Madrid CF – Overview

Real Madrid CF